Felix Chouinard (October 5, 1887 – April 28, 1955) was an outfielder in Major League Baseball in 1910, 1911, 1914 and 1915.

Sources

1887 births
1955 deaths
Major League Baseball outfielders
Chicago White Sox players
Pittsburgh Rebels players
Brooklyn Tip-Tops players
Baltimore Terrapins players
Major League Baseball center fielders
Des Moines Boosters players
Green Bay Bays players
Baseball players from Chicago